Skepticon is a skeptic and secular convention held in the United States. Guest speakers are invited to discuss skepticism, science, education, activism, and other related topics. This free event is sponsored by American Atheists and the American Humanist Association, among other organizations.

History
The Skepticon conference grew out of a speaking engagement organized by a student group on the campus of Missouri State University. The students invited two well-known atheist speakers, PZ Myers and Richard Carrier, to campus to speak critically about belief in God. The event was considered particularly controversial because Springfield, Missouri, is home to the Assemblies of God national headquarters and the campuses of several religious universities, including Evangel University.

In the years that followed, the conference was able to attract additional speakers willing to reduce or forgo their speakers' fees so as to keep the conference free for attendees. Donors help with the cost of event space and speakers' travel costs.

In July 2010, Skepticon received the "Best On Campus Event" award from the Center for Inquiry.

Shortly before Skepticon III in November 2010, critics questioned the naming of the convention, suggesting that it focused more on atheism than skepticism.

Skepticon IV (2011) featured a tour of a nearby creationist museum, two full days of lectures detailing science-related topics, and a performance by Atheist Evangelist Brother Sam Singleton. A local gelato shop owner took offense to Singleton's performance and posted a sign in the store window which read "Skepticon is NOT welcomed to my Christian Business." The resulting internet reaction had a negative impact on the store's user ratings on a number of consumer satisfaction websites. Three days later the shop owner posted an apology on the website Reddit. Concern over whether the sign violated the Civil Rights Act of 1964 earned the incident the nickname "gelato-gate."

In 2016, Skepticon banned Carrier for what organizer Lauren Lane described as "repeated boundary-pushing behavior." Later that year, Carrier sued Skepticon and Lane for defamation, tortious interference, and emotional distress.

Atheism vs. Christianity debate

Skepticon 2009 featured a debate between Christian and atheist experts on the question "Does God exist?" Participants included Richard Carrier, Victor Stenger, and JT Eberhard for the atheist perspective and professors Charlie Self, Zachary Manis, and Greg Ojakangas presenting the Christian position.

Confrontation vs. accommodation debate
Skepticon III (2010) explored the merits of confrontation versus accommodation and featured a debate between James Randi, PZ Myers, Richard Carrier, and Amanda Marcotte.

Locations, dates and speakers

References

External links 

 

Conventions in Missouri
Atheism
Skeptic conferences
Recurring events established in 2008